Jesús Manzaneque Sánchez (born 1 January 1943) is a Spanish former road racing cyclist. He is the younger brother of Fernando Manzaneque.

Palmarès

1969
 Trofeo Elola
1971
Vuelta a La Rioja
1972
 1st, Stage 9b, Vuelta a España
1973
Volta a Portugal
Vuelta a La Rioja
1974
Vuelta a La Rioja
Trofeo Elola
1975
Trofeo Elola
 1st, Stage 19b, Vuelta a España
 1st, Stage 4, Vuelta a Andalucía

External links

1943 births
Living people
Sportspeople from the Province of Ciudad Real
Spanish male cyclists
Spanish Vuelta a España stage winners
Volta a Portugal winners
Cyclists from Castilla-La Mancha